Lars-Fredrik Nyström (born August 10, 1949) is a retired Swedish ice hockey player. He started his professional career in Skellefteå AIK where he played until 1977 when he joined Djurgårdens IF. He ended his playing career after the 1981–82 season in the same club. During the following season Nyström became assistant coach to head coach Gunnar Svensson. When Svensson was fired January 21, 1986, Nyström along with former Djurgården player and team captain Håkan Eriksson coached Djurgården for the rest of the 1985–86 season. He later became head coach for Rögle BK.

Career statistics

References

External links

1949 births
Djurgårdens IF Hockey players
Skellefteå AIK players
Living people
Swedish ice hockey players
Swedish ice hockey coaches
Djurgårdens IF Hockey coaches